Liolaemus darwinii, also known commonly as Darwin's tree iguana, is a species of lizard in the family Liolaemidae. The species is endemic to Argentina.

Etymology
The specific name, darwinii, is in honor of English naturalist Charles Darwin, the author of On the Origin of Species.

Habitat

Description
The males of L. darwinii are brown with two yellow dorsal stripes that run along the spine, one on each side of the back. The females are solely brown.

Diet
L. darwinii eats various insects  or less in length, including beetles and locusts.

Behavior
L. darwinii is diurnal. During nights and cold days, it burrows underground. It is a solitary and territorial. Males and females compete for territory.

Reproduction
L. darwinii is oviparous. The mating season is in mid-February, and the nesting time is eight months later.

References

Further reading
Bell T (1843). The Zoology of H.M.S. Beagle, Under the Command of Captain Fitzroy, R.N., During the Years 1832 to 1836. London: Smith, Elder and Company. (Stewart and Murray, printers). vi + 51 pp. + Plates 1-20. (Proctotretus darwinii, new species, pp. 14–15 + Plate 7, Figures 1, 1a, 1b, 2, 2a).
Boulenger GA (1885). Catalogue of the Lizards in the British Museum (Natural History). Second Edition. Volume II. Iguanidæ .... London: Trustees of the British Museum (Natural History). (Taylor and Francis, printers). xiii + 497 pp. + Plates I-XXIV. ("Liolæmus darwinii ", p. 155).
Donoso-Barros, Roberto (1966). Reptiles de Chile. Santiago: Ediciones Universidad de Chile. 458 pp.

darwinii
Lizards of South America
Endemic fauna of Argentina
Reptiles of Argentina
Reptiles described in 1843
Taxa named by Thomas Bell (zoologist)